Robin Maximilian Meißner (born 8 October 1999) is a German professional footballer who plays as a centre-forward for  club Viktoria Köln on loan from Hamburger SV.

Career
Meißner made his professional debut for Hamburger SV in the 2. Bundesliga on 1 March 2021, coming on as a substitute in the first minute of second-half stoppage time against his former club FC St. Pauli. The away match finished as a 1–0 loss for Hamburg.

On 30 January 2022, Meißner joined Hansa Rostock on loan until the end of the season. On 27 July 2022, he moved on a new loan to Viktoria Köln.

References

External links
 
 
 

1999 births
Living people
German footballers
Association football forwards
Germany youth international footballers
FC St. Pauli II players
Hamburger SV II players
Hamburger SV players
FC Hansa Rostock players
FC Viktoria Köln players
2. Bundesliga players
Regionalliga players
Footballers from Hamburg